"I'll Go" is a song by American neo soul/R&B singer Rahsaan Patterson. It was co-written, co-produced by Patterson and Steve Hurley, never officially released on any Patterson albums. R&B singer Donell Jones recorded his cover of the tune that appears on the soundtrack album, Love & Basketball released in April 2000.

Patterson's recorded version is on Soul Togetherness released on Expansion Records, a 2001 compilation album featuring various artists, which include Al Green, Rachelle Ferrell, The Spinners and Reggie Calloway.

References

External links
www.play.com soultogetherness
www.amazon.co.uk soultogetherness

2001 songs
Rahsaan Patterson songs
Songs written by Steve "Silk" Hurley
Songs written by Rahsaan Patterson